Estelle Brody (15 August 1900 – 3 June 1995) was an American actress who became one of the biggest female stars of British silent film in the latter half of the 1920s.  Her career was then derailed by a series of ill-advised decisions and she disappeared from sight for many years before re-emerging between the late 1940s and the 1960s in smaller supporting film and television roles.

Early life and stardom
Brody was born in New York City, and began her career as a dancer in vaudeville. Her father Joseph Brody was a composer of Jewish music who had been born in Russia. After working for some time as part of a touring troupe travelling round the U.S., she moved to England in the 1920s, finding work in West End theatres.  Although Brody had no previous acting experience, her vivaciousness was spotted by film director Thomas Bentley, who offered her a supporting role in his 1926 film White Heat.  She then immediately landed the lead role for Maurice Elvey in Mademoiselle from Armentieres, set in France during World War I.  This turned out to be a huge popular success, running in British cinemas for several months and becoming reportedly the highest-grossing British-made film of 1926.  To Brody's great surprise, she found herself acclaimed as a new star by the British media.  At the time there was a general feeling, both from critics and audiences, of dissatisfaction with what was seen as excessive American influence on British film-making.  To pre-empt this, publicity material falsely claimed Brody to be a Canadian citizen.  This was accepted as fact, and the misapprehension would persist throughout her career.

Brody spent the remainder of the 1920s starring in a number of high-profile productions which earned her critical and popular acclaim as a natural in front of the camera.  Reflecting on this period in later life, Brody commented: "Apparently my work went over well.  Beyond my wildest dreams".  Her most enduring performance is generally considered to be in 1927's Hindle Wakes, again for Elvey.  This was the second silent version of the famous, and controversial in its time, stage play by Stanley Houghton, and received an appropriate budget for a prestige production.  Extensive location filming took place in Manchester and Blackpool, giving the film a documentary realism feel very unusual in British silent cinema, which is now regarded as a valuable socio-historical portrait of 1920s Lancashire.

In 1929, Brody had just finished work on the silent film Kitty, when director Victor Saville decided to reshoot the second half of the film with sound.  As the British studio lacked the necessary facilities, Brody and co-star John Stuart were despatched to New York where the scenes were shot at RKO Studios, with Brody in the odd situation of being in the city of her birth but having to disguise her native accent in order to sound like a London girl.

Career decline and later life
Returning from New York, Brody found the British film industry in a state of flux and uncertainty on the cusp of the transition from silents to talkies.  Her voice was not considered desirable by British producers at the time, which heightened her anxiety about the situation. When no new film offers were immediately forthcoming, she made the decision to try her luck in Hollywood.  She later acknowledged that this had been a major mistake; not only did she at a stroke alienate a large number of her British fans who accused her of betrayal, but once in Hollywood she found that her status in Britain counted for nothing with American directors.  The few offers made were not the kind of roles she wished to play, and ultimately she would only appear as support in two films in which her characters were billed as "Girl from Kokomo" and "Prisoner".

Disillusioned with her Hollywood experiences, Brody returned to England in the mid-1930s but did not seek to resurrect her British career.  She married Robert Fenn, an agent representing actors and film composers, and settled into private life out of the spotlight.  She finally returned to the screen in 1949 with a minor role in I Was a Male War Bride and for the next decade made sporadic film appearances, with her last film credit coming in Never Take Sweets from a Stranger in 1960.  She also appeared occasionally in TV productions in the 1950s and early 1960s.

In 1969, Brody and Fenn relocated to Malta, where they spent the remainder of their lives.  Brody died in Valletta on 3 June 1995, aged 94.

Filmography

 Mademoiselle from Armentieres (1926) - Mademoiselle
 White Heat (1926) - Ninon
 The Glad Eye (1927) - Kiki
 Hindle Wakes (1927) - Fanny Hawthorn
 The Flight Commander (1927) - Mary
 The Marriage Business (1927) - Annette
 Sailors Don't Care (1928) - Jenny Melrose
 Mademoiselle Parley Voo (1928) - Mademoiselle
 Weekend Wives (1929) - Madame le Grand
 Kitty (1929) - Kitty Greenwood
 The Plaything (1929) - Joyce Bennett

 A Broadway Romeo (1931) - Girl from Kokomo
 Ann Vickers (1933) - Prisoner (uncredited)
 I Was a Male War Bride (1949) - WAC Announcer Officer (uncredited)
 They Were Not Divided (1950) - War Correspondent
 Lilli Marlene (1950) - Estelle
 Finishing School (1953) - Mrs. Whitmore
 Safari (1956) - Aunty May
 The Story of Esther Costello (1957) - Tammy
 Breakout (1959) - Maureen O'Quinn
 Never Take Sweets from a Stranger (1960) - Eunice Kalliduke

See also
Cinema of the United States
American silent film actresses
American film actresses
American silent films
British silent films
British silent film actresses

References

External links

1900 births
1995 deaths
American film actresses
American silent film actresses
Actresses from New York City
American expatriates in England
20th-century American actresses